"Y No Puedo Olvidarte" (English: "And I Can't Forget About You") is a song from Mexican pop group RBD. It's the third and final single from their fifth studio album (fourth Spanish album), Empezar Desde Cero (2007), as well as being the group's final single before disbanding later in the year. The song was announced as the third single on June 5, 2008, followed by a common Mexican radio release on the same day. The single supports the re-release fan edition of Empezar desde Cero, which was available since June 21, 2008 in Mexico. An official music video was not made.

The former single, "Empezar desde Cero" was chosen through a poll on RBD's official website. "Y No Puedo Olvidarte" ended in second place, with 30% of the votes (while "Empezar Desde Cero" gained 40%), finishing the decision of choosing a third single.

On July 17, 2008, the song was performed for the first time on television on Univision's Premios Juventud. After the release of the parent album, Y No Puedo Olvidarte was included in the setlists at numerous presentations and promotional stops as well as being performed during their final two tours.

Music video
A music video was commissioned to be filmed following the announcement of the song's release as a single. After the announcement of the band's disbandment, the filming of the video was canceled and further promotion for the song was canceled.

References

2007 songs
2008 singles
RBD songs
EMI Records singles
Songs written by Carlos Lara (songwriter)